Capitol Christian Music Group (Capitol CMG) (formerly known as EMI Christian Music Group) is an American music group that, since 2013, is under the ownership of Universal Music Group. It is based in Brentwood, Tennessee. Capitol CMG is in the Christian Gospel music industry.

Capitol CMG is a company whose assets include such labels as Sparrow and ForeFront Records as well as the industry's distribution company and a publishing company.

Capitol CMG features artists such as Chris Tomlin, TobyMac, Amy Grant, Jeremy Camp, Michael W. Smith, Newsboys, Matt Redman, Matthew West, and CeCe Winans.

History 
The music group was founded by Billy Ray Hearn in February 1976 as Sparrow Records. Sparrow was acquired by EMI in 1992. Formerly known as EMI Christian Music Group, Capitol CMG is a division of Capitol Music Group, which is now a Universal Music Group company. 

The company's roster features names in the Christian and gospel communities, among them Amy Grant, Jeremy Camp, Michael W. Smith, Smokie Norful, Tye Tribbett, Britt Nicole, Crowder, Newsboys, Matt Redman, Tasha Cobbs Leonard, Kierra Sheard-Kelly, Sheri Jones-Moffett, Colton Dixon, Brian Courtney Wilson, Mandisa, Paul Porter, Matthew West, Kari Jobe, The Young Escape, Merry Clayton, Riley Clemmons, Social Club Misfits, and Blessing Offor.

Labels 
 Capitol Christian Distribution (formerly EMI CMG Distribution)
 Capitol CMG Group (formerly EMI CMG Group)
 Credential Recordings
 ForeFront Records
 Motown Gospel (formerly EMI Gospel)
 Sparrow Records
 Worship Together
 Capitol CMG Publishing
Brentwood-Benson
Meadowgreen Music
 Hillsong Music (distribution)
 sixstepsrecords (distribution)

See also 
 Christian record labels
 EMI
 List of record labels

References

External links
 

1976 establishments in Tennessee
American record labels
Capitol Records
Christian record labels
Labels distributed by Universal Music Group